The 2010 Mercury Insurance Open was a women's tennis tournament played on outdoor hard courts. It was the first edition of the Southern California Open since the tournament left the tour in 2007. It was classified as one of the WTA Premier tournaments of the 2010 WTA Tour. It was played in San Diego, California, United States. Svetlana Kuznetsova won the singles title.

WTA entrants

Seeds

 Seedings are based on the rankings of July 26, 2010.

Other entrants
The following players received wildcards into the singles main draw:

  Dominika Cibulková
  Gisela Dulko
  Ana Ivanovic

The following players received entry from the qualifying draw:
  Kurumi Nara
  Shenay Perry
  Chanelle Scheepers
  CoCo Vandeweghe

The following player received entry by a lucky loser spot:
  Jamie Hampton

Finals

Singles

 Svetlana Kuznetsova defeated  Agnieszka Radwańska, 6–4, 6–7(7–9), 6–3
It was Kuznetsova's first title of the year and 13th of her career.

Doubles

 Maria Kirilenko /  Zheng Jie defeated  Lisa Raymond /  Rennae Stubbs, 6–4, 6–4

External links
 
 ITF tournament edition details

2010 WTA Tour
2010
2010 in sports in California